Zaza–Gorani is a linguistic subgroup of Northwestern Iranian languages. They are usually classified as a non-Kurdish branch of the Northwestern Iranian languages but most of their speakers consider themselves ethnic Kurds.

The Zaza–Gorani languages are the Zaza and the Gorani languages, whereas Gorani is composed of four dialects being Hawrami, Bajelani, Shabaki and Sarli.

Sources

External links
www.zazaki.net (Kırmanc, Zaza, Kırd, Dimli)
www.zazaki.de

Northwestern Iranian languages
Languages of Kurdistan
Languages of Iraq
Languages of Iran
Languages of Turkey
Kurdish people
Zaza people

Gallery